Sōma is a city in Fukushima Prefecture, Japan.

Sōma may also refer to:

Places
Sōma, Aomori, a village
Sōma District, Fukushima
Sōma Domain, a minor feudal domain during the Edo period
Sōma Station, a railway station in Sōma, Fukushima

People with the given name
Soma Cruz, fictional character
, Japanese footballer
, Japanese voice actor

Other uses
Sōma (surname), a Japanese surname
Sōma clan, a Japanese samurai clan
Sōma ware, a form of Japanese pottery

See also
Soma (disambiguation)
Souma (disambiguation)

Japanese masculine given names